Madras is a city in and the county seat of Jefferson County, Oregon,  United States. Originally called "The Basin" after the circular valley the city is in, it is unclear whether Madras was named in 1903 for the cotton fabric called "Madras" that originated in the city of Madras (now Chennai) in Tamil Nadu,  India or from the name of the city itself. The population was 6,046 at the 2010 census.

History

The original plat for Madras was filed on July 18, 1902, by Scandinavian immigrant John A. Palmehn, for whom the town was originally named "Palmain". The name was rejected by the U.S. Postal Service over its similarity to a post office named Parmen, and the name "Madras" was adopted, inspired by the cloth fabric of the same name, itself named for the city of Madras (now Chennai) in India.

Madras was incorporated as a city in 1911. An Army Air Corps base was built nearby during World War II. This airfield now serves as the Madras Municipal Airport.

GMO incident
Because the grower could not remove all genetically engineered plants, the U.S. Department of Agriculture fined the grower $500,000 for non-compliance with regulations in 2007.

2017 solar eclipse

The centerline of the path of totality of the Solar eclipse of August 21, 2017, ran through the center of Madras. Because the city is located in a high desert environment and has consistently clear skies in August, it was considered a prime eclipse viewing location. All of the hotel and motel rooms in the area had been reserved for several years. The town had prepared for an influx of about 100,000 visitors for the eclipse.

Sights
Madras is home to the Erickson Aircraft Collection, a privately owned collection of airworthy vintage aircraft.  The collection is open to the public Tuesday through Sunday, 10 a.m. to 5 p.m. The Jefferson County Fair is held on county property along Fairgrounds Road in Madras. The annual fair takes place in late July.

Geography and climate

Madras has a steppe climate (BSk) according to the Köppen climate classification system, also known as semi-arid.

Demographics

2010 census
As of the census of 2010, there were 6,046 people, 2,198 households, and 1,430 families residing in the city. The racial makeup of the city was 66.4% White, 0.7% African American, 6.9% Native American, 0.8% Asian, 0.2% Pacific Islander, 19.7% from other races, and 5.4% from two or more races. Hispanic or Latino of any race were 38.5% of the population.

There were 2,198 households, of which 41.2% had children under the age of 18 living with them, 42.5% were married couples living together, 15.9% had a female householder with no husband present, 6.6% had a male householder with no wife present, and 34.9% were non-families. 28.5% of all households were made up of individuals, and 11.2% had someone living alone who was 65 years of age or older. The average household size was 2.69 and the average family size was 3.31.

The median age in the city was 31.2 years. 30.8% of residents were under the age of 18; 10.4% were between the ages of 18 and 24; 27.1% were from 25 to 44; 21.6% were from 45 to 64; and 10.3% were 65 years of age or older. The gender makeup of the city was 49.3% male and 50.7% female.

2000 census
As of the census of 2000, there were 5,078 people, 1,801 households, and 1,251 families residing in the city. The population density was 2,326.9 people per square mile (899.4/km). There were 1,952 housing units at an average density of 894.5 per square mile (345.7/km). The racial makeup of the city was 63.55% White, 0.59% African American, 6.14% Native American, 0.55% Asian, 0.35% Pacific Islander, 24.56% from other races, and 4.25% from two or more races. Hispanic or Latino of any race were 35.74% of the population.

There were 1,801 households, out of which 41.0% had children under the age of 18 living with them, 49.2% were married couples living together, 12.9% had a female householder with no husband present, and 30.5% were non-families. 25.3% of all households were made up of individuals, and 9.2% had someone living alone who was 65 years of age or older. The average household size was 2.78 and the average family size was 3.32.

In the city, the population was spread out, with 33.1% under the age of 18, 10.6% from 18 to 24, 29.7% from 25 to 44, 16.1% from 45 to 64, and 10.5% who were 65 years of age or older. The median age was 29 years. For every 100 females, there were 95.3 males. For every 100 females age 18 and over, there were 94.8 males.

The median income for a household in the city was $29,103, and the median income for a family was $33,275. Males had a median income of $27,656 versus $19,464 for females. The per capita income for the city was $12,937. About 15.2% of families and 19.6% of the population were below the poverty line, including 26.3% of those under age 18 and 10.0% of those age 65 or over.

Infrastructure

Transportation
Highway
 U.S. Route 26
 U.S. Route 97

Rail
 BNSF Railway (formerly Oregon Trunk Railway)
 Union Pacific Railroad shares operations on the same tracks

Air
In addition to the public City-County Airport, Madras has several private use airports in the area:
 Bombay Farms Airport
 St. Charles Madras Heliport
 Ochs Private Airport
 Six Springs Ranch Airport

Notable people 

Jacoby Ellsbury (b. 1983) — Major League Baseball player
Boyd R. Overhulse (1909–1966) — attorney and state legislator
River Phoenix (1970–1993) — actor born in Madras

Sister city
Madras has one sister city, as designated by Sister Cities International:

 Tōmi, Nagano, Japan. (Tōmi was formed in 2004 by merger of Kitamimaki, which was already twinned with Madras, and Tōbu.)

See also
Madras High School

References

External links

Madras listing in the Oregon Blue Book

 
1903 establishments in Oregon
Cities in Jefferson County, Oregon
Cities in Oregon
County seats in Oregon
Populated places established in 1903